Pasuruan Station (PS) is a railway station located in Trajeng, Panggungrejo, Pasuruan; this station entered within western border of PT.KAI 9th Operation Area of Jember at the height of ± 3 meters above sea level.

This station is the terminus station for Local Commuter Surabaya-Pasuruan train. At present, all of the passenger trains which travel through Bangil-Jember line are stopped at this station.

History 
This station is one of the most oldest train stations in East Java, commissioned by Staatsspoorwegen Eastern Exploitation on May, 16th 1878 as the end point of Surabaya-Sidoarjo-Bangil-Pasuruan line. It was built not far from Hoofdstraat or de Groote Postweg road, also was known as Post Daendels road (now become Soekarno Hatta provincial road), connected by Station street which access-link from Soekarno Hatta road to this station and also there is Pasar Besar of Pasuruan located just east side, used as traditional market activity for Pasuruans. This station adopted Indische-Empire and Neoclassic decoration style.

At the past, the station had 7 tracks which one of them entered train workshop, warehouses and a locomotive turntable. And then, from first track of this station (eastern side) there was fork which connected to the light rail line or tram line belonged to a private railway company named Pasoeroean Stoomtram Maatschappij (PsSM) which passed behind Pasar Besar of Pasuruan and entered their station (approximately around 30 to 40 meters west of the station) to Waroengdowo via Broodbakkerstraat or Chinatown (now become K.H.Wachid Hasyim street or so called Niaga street). This private railway company also opened tram line from Waroengdowo to Winongan, Alkmaar (Purwosari) and Ngempit which had been deactivated.

In addition, to the west of this station before entering Bangil there was a small station named Kraton which was used by natives as commute station for them and also connected to the coffee factory not far from there also deactivated because the station was so close from Pasuruan.

Pasuruan Railway Station is a side platform type railway station. By now, this station has 4 active tracks which the second track is straight track with an additional track as a buffer stop.

Building Layout 

Pasuruan is a side platform railway station which has 1 side platform at first track and 1 island platform at second track as a stop for intercity train. If there's no local commuter, first track can be used as follow-up/cross. Sometimes, third track is used when train traffic at busy or there's a train which come late or early. Meanwhile, fourth track is rarely used.

Train Services

Commuter Line

Intercity

Gallery

References

External links
 

Railway stations in East Java
Railway stations opened in 1878